Jacques Beaulieu (born April 1, 1968) is a Canadian ice hockey coach. He is the former head coach and general manager for the Sarnia Sting of the Ontario Hockey League (OHL)

Beaulieu is the father of Anaheim Ducks defenseman Nathan Beaulieu. Beaulieu was awarded the 2007–08 Maurice Filion Trophy as the QMJHL's Coach of the Year.

References

External links
Jacques Beaulieu Profile at eliteprospects.com

1968 births
Living people
Canadian ice hockey coaches
Franco-Ontarian people
Ice hockey people from Ontario
People from Strathroy-Caradoc
Saint John Sea Dogs coaches
Sarnia Sting coaches